Nicky Souter (born 6 May 1984) is an Australian sailor competing in match racing. Souter won the 2009 ISAF Women's Match Racing World Championship and placed 3rd in the 2010 Women's Match Racing World Championships. In 2010, Souter was named Australian Female Sailor of the Year.

References

Australian female sailors (sport)
1984 births
Living people
21st-century Australian women